Group B of the 2015 Africa Cup of Nations qualification tournament was one of the seven groups to decide the teams which qualified for the 2015 Africa Cup of Nations finals tournament. Group B consisted of four teams: Algeria, Mali, Malawi, and Ethiopia, who played against each other home-and-away in a round-robin format.

Standings

Matches

Goalscorers 

3 goals
 Yacine Brahimi
2 goals
 Riyad Mahrez
 Bakary Sako
 Mustapha Yatabaré
 Atusaye Nyondo
 Getaneh Kebede
 Oumed Oukri
1 goals
 Hillal Soudani
 Carl Medjani
 Rafik Halliche
 Djamel Mesbah
 Sofiane Feghouli
 Cheick Diabaté
 Abdoulay Diaby
 Sambou Yatabaré
 Seydou Keita
 Frank Banda
 Robert Ng'ambi
 Essau Kanyenda
 Saladin Said
 Yussuf Saleh
 Abebaw Butako

Discipline

Notes

References

External links 
Orange Africa Cup Of Nations Qualifiers, CAFonline.com

Group B